Juan Martín del Potro was the defending champion and successfully defended his title, defeating Roger Federer in the final, 7–6(7–3), 2–6, 6–4.

Roger Federer became only the second man in the Open Era to reach the final of an event 10 times, a record he shared at the time with Guillermo Vilas.

Seeds

Draw

Finals

Top half

Bottom half

Qualifying

Seeds

Qualifiers

Qualifying draw

First qualifier

Second qualifier

Third qualifier

Fourth qualifier

References
 Main Draw
 Qualifying Draw

Swiss Indoors - Singles
2013 Davidoff Swiss Indoors